The Ch'alla Jawira (Aymara ch'alla sand, jawira river, "sand river", also spelled Challa Jahuira, Challajahuira) which upstream is named Ch'api K'uchu and downstream successively is called Tupa Jawira and Qura Jawira is a river in the La Paz  Department in Bolivia. It is a right affluent of the Aqhuya Jawira whose waters flow to the Desaguadero River.

It has a south-eastern direction while it crosses the Coro Coro Municipality. The river flows along Janq'u Qalani where it receives the name Ch'alla Jawira. Near a mountain named Puki Tira it is named Tupa Jawira. Shortly before it receives waters from a left affluent named Wichhu Qullu it changes its name to Qura Jawira (Khora). Now Suni Jawira ("deserted river") which originates southwest of the source of Ch'alla Jawira and partly almost flows parallel to it joins the river as a right affluent.

References

Rivers of La Paz Department (Bolivia)